A communist revolution is a proletarian revolution often, but not necessarily, inspired by the ideas of Marxism that aims to replace capitalism with communism. Depending on the type of government, the term socialism can be used to indicate an intermediate stage between Capitalism and Communism (especially in Marxist-Leninist views). The idea that a proletarian revolution is needed is a cornerstone of Marxism; Marxists believe that the workers of the world must unite and free themselves from capitalist oppression to create a world run by and for the working class. Thus, in the Marxist view, proletarian revolutions need to happen in countries all over the world.

Leninism argues that a communist revolution must be led by a vanguard of "professional revolutionaries", men and women who are fully dedicated to the communist cause and who can then form the nucleus of the revolutionary movement. Some Marxists disagree with the idea of a vanguard as put forth by Lenin, especially left communists. Some who continue to consider themselves Marxist–Leninists also oppose the vanguard despite disagreeing with the majority of left communism. These critics insist that the entire working class—or at least a large part of it—must be deeply involved and equally committed to the socialist or communist cause in order for a proletarian revolution to be successful. To this end, they seek to build massive communist parties with very large memberships.

Communist revolutions throughout history 

The following is a list of successful and unsuccessful communist revolutions throughout history. Among the lesser known revolutions, a number of borderline cases have been included which may or may not have been communist revolutions. The nature of unsuccessful revolutions is particularly contentious since one can only speculate as to the kinds of policies that would have been implemented by the revolutionaries had they achieved victory.
 The 1917 communist revolution in the Russian Republic, known as the October Revolution and a part of the Russian Revolution. It resulted in the victory of the Bolsheviks and the creation of Soviet Russia, the predecessor of the Soviet Union.
 The Canadian Labour Revolt was a series of loosely connected strikes, riots and labour conflicts primarily organized by the One Big Union (OBU) that occurred from 1917-1925 but ended in defeat.
 The German Revolution of 1918–19, led by Rosa Luxemburg and Karl Liebknecht, which ended in defeat for the communists.
 The creation of the Hungarian Soviet Republic in 1919, led by Béla Kun, which was defeated after five months.
 The creation of the short-lived Bavarian Soviet Republic in 1919, which was defeated within a month by the German army and Freikorps.
 The Mongolian Revolution of 1921 led by the Mongolian People's Revolutionary Party, which defeated the Republic of China's Mongolian puppet state and the White Guards under Baron Ungern with the help of the Russian Red Army.
 The anti-fascist, socialist Labin Republic uprising in modern-day Labin, Croatia, which pushed out Mussolini's fascist forces and established a socialist society in the city and surrounding towns for approximately one month
 The 1932 Salvadoran peasant uprising, known as La matanza (the slaughter), Pipil and peasant rebellion led by Farabundo Martí.
 The Spanish Revolution of 1936
 The People's Liberation War in Yugoslavia waged by the Yugoslav Partisans under the command of Josip Broz Tito with Allied support against the invading forces of Nazi Germany and the Yugoslav monarchists known as the Chetniks. The victorious partisans establish the Socialist Federal Republic of Yugoslavia.
 The August Revolution of 1945 creating the Democratic Republic of Vietnam.
 The Proclamation of the Democratic People's Republic of Korea in 1948, when the Soviet-backed Workers' Party of Korea, led by Kim Il-sung, announced the formation of the state of the Democratic People's Republic of Korea. However as of 1992, the country no longer prescribes to Marxism–Leninism, and as of 2009 is no longer a communist state.
 The Cuban Revolution of 1959 was a nationalistic revolution led by Fidel Castro and Che Guevara which overthrew former president Fulgencio Batista and instated a Marxist–Leninist socialist regime later on in Cuba. Even though Batista had been elected for his first term, he got himself into power for his second term through a coup d'état.
 Les Trois Glorieuses of 1963 in Congo-Brazzaville, a successful coup d'état led by the Confédération générale aéfienne du travail and the Union de la jeunesse congolaise against Fulbert Youlou established the People's Republic of the Congo.
 The Communist Party of Indonesia's support for President Sukarno, which ended when Indonesian General Suharto removed President Sukarno from power and unleashed a wave of mass killings against real or alleged communists.
 The First Indochina War that resulted in the defeat of the French at the Battle of Dien Bien Phu, 1954, and brought the Communist Party of Vietnam under Ho Chi Minh to power in North Vietnam. A victory followed closely by the protracted guerrilla warfare-dominated Vietnam War (1957–1975), which in turn led to the fall of Saigon and the driving-out of occupying United States military forces there, and the unification of North and South Vietnam by communist guerrilla forces into the Socialist Republic of Vietnam. The conflict drastically changed neighboring Laos and Cambodia.
 The Malayan Emergency when the Malayan Communist Party and communist guerrillas fought against, and were defeated by, British and Malayan forces.
 The overthrow of Emperor Haile Selassie by Mengistu Haile Mariam who then set up one-party Marxist–Leninist rule in Ethiopia by the communist Workers' Party of Ethiopia establishing the People's Democratic Republic of Ethiopia, until they were defeated and expelled by the socialist and Hoxhaist Ethiopian People's Revolutionary Democratic Front during a subsequent civil war.
 The Carnation Revolution, when leftist and anti-colonial forces in the Portuguese military overthrew the longtime authoritarian government of Portugal, under Marcelo Caetano.
 The Saur Revolution that brought the People's Democratic Party of Afghanistan to power in Afghanistan. They were overthrown by the mujahideen in 1992.
 The overthrow of Eric Gairy that brought the New Jewel Movement to power in Grenada from 1979 until 1983, when they were deposed by a United States-led invasion.
 The Salvadoran Civil War, from 1980 - 1992, FMLN (mainly composed of Marxist–Leninist guerrilla groups) fought against the U.S. backed military government which suppressed the rebel movement by framing and mass murdering alleged Marxist–Leninist revolutionaries (El Mozote massacre). The FMLN was inspired by the ideologies of Farabundo Martí and Vladimir Lenin
 The Janatha Vimukthi Peramuna (JVP) rebellion in Sri Lanka in 1971 and from 1987 to 1989. The JVP fought with Sri Lankan then government, but defeated at both two occasions. Rohana Wijeweera, leader of the JVP, was captured by the government force and summarily executed in 1989.
 The Burkina Faso Revolution 1983–1987. Thomas Sankara dissolved Upper Volta and proclaimed Burkina Faso, "Land of Upright People". The revolution suppressed most of the powers held by tribal chiefs in Burkina Faso. These feudal landlords were stripped of their rights to tribute payments and forced labour as well as having their land distributed amongst the peasantry.

See also 

 Class conflict
 Communist state
 Communist society

References 

 
Revolutions by type
20th-century revolutions